North Pack Monadnock or North Pack Monadnock Mountain is a  monadnock in south-central New Hampshire, at the northern end of the Wapack Range of mountains. It lies within Greenfield and Temple, New Hampshire; the  Wapack Trail traverses the mountain. Ledges on the summit offer long views north to the White Mountains and west to Mount Monadnock. Pack Monadnock Mountain is directly to the south along the Wapack ridgeline. The upper elevations of the mountain are within Miller State Park.

According to local tradition, the word "pack" is a Native American word for "little"; "monadnock" is used to describe an isolated mountain summit. Thus "Pack Monadnock" (Little Monadnock) refers to its relationship to the higher Mount Monadnock,  to the west. It should not be confused with the similarly named peak Little Monadnock Mountain,  to the west.

The east side of the mountain drains into the Souhegan River watershed, thence into the Merrimack River and Atlantic Ocean; the west side drains into the Contoocook River, thence into the Merrimack River.

References

 Southern New Hampshire Trail Guide (1999). Boston: The Appalachian Mountain Club.

External links
 Friends of the Wapack

Mountains of Hillsborough County, New Hampshire
Mountains of New Hampshire
Greenfield, New Hampshire
Temple, New Hampshire
Pack Monadnock, North